Weipa is a coastal mining town in the local government area of Weipa Town in Queensland. It is the largest town on the Cape York Peninsula.  It exists because of the enormous bauxite deposits along the coast. The Port of Weipa is mainly involved in exports of bauxite. There are also shipments of live cattle from the port.

Geography
Weipa is on the western coast of the Cape York Peninsula facing the Gulf of Carpentaria.

Weipa is just south of Duyfken Point, which was named by Matthew Flinders on 8 November 1802 after the ship Duyfken commanded by the Dutch explorer Willem Janszoon. It is claimed that Janszoon was the first European to sight the Australian coast in the Gulf of Carpentaria in 1606, 164 years before Lieutenant James Cook sailed up the east coast of Australia.

The town consists of three residential suburbs, Rocky Point, Trunding, and Nanum, in addition to the industrial suburb of Evans Landing; these suburbs are contiguous. The town also includes the suburb of Weipa Airport which is not connected to the other suburbs and contains the town's airport.

History

Traditional owners and languages
Yupanguthi (Yuputhimri, Jupangati, Yupangathi, Nggerikudi, Yupungati, Jupangati) is an Australian Aboriginal language spoken on Yupanguthi country. The Yupanguthi language region includes the landscape within the local government boundaries of the landscape within the local government boundaries of the Shire of Cook and Weipa Region.

Kugu Yi'anh is a language of Cape York. The traditional language area of Kugu Yi'anh includes landscape within the local government boundaries of the Cook Shire.

Kugu Nganchara (also known as Wik, Wiknantjara, Wik Nganychara, Wik Ngencherr. See also related Wik languages) is a traditional language of the area which includes the landscape within the local government boundaries of the Cook Shire.

Kugu Muminh (also known as Kuku-Muminh. See also related Wik languages) is one of the traditional languages which includes the landscape within the local government boundaries of the Cook Shire. Thaynakwith (also known as Awngthim, Tainikuit and Winduwinda) is an Australian Aboriginal language spoken on Western Cape York in the Weipa area taking in Albatross Bay and Mission River. The language region includes areas within the local government boundaries of Weipa Town Council and Cook Shire.

Weipa Mission
In 1895, Presbyterian missionary Reverend Nicholas John Hey established a mission at the junction of Embley River and Spring Creek which he called Weipa, which is believed to derive from the Anhathangayth word meaning "fighting ground".

Very restrictive legislation was enacted by the state of Queensland in 1911, making the Protector of Aborigines the legal guardian of every Aboriginal and part-Aboriginal child (until he/she was 21), and the right to confine (or expel) any such person within any Aboriginal reserve or institution, and the right to imprison any Aboriginal or part-Aboriginal person for 14 days if, in the Protector's judgement, they were guilty of neglect of duty, gross insubordination or wilful preaching of disobedience. It also gave powers to the police to confine Aboriginal people to reserves to "protect them from corruption". This latter power was given by Comalco in 1957 to justify the removal of Weipa Aboriginal people.

In 1932, the community had to relocate to its present site, at Jessica Point now called Napranum because of malaria. At this time most of the people were Awngthim but soon different tribes and clans and other communities were forcibly removed from Old Mapoon. To prevent the spread of malaria, the Old Mapoon settlement was burnt down on 15 November 1963.

Mining town
In 1955 a geologist, Henry Evans (1912–1990), discovered that the red cliffs on the Aboriginal reserve, previously remarked on by the early Dutch explorers and Matthew Flinders, were actually enormous deposits of bauxite – the ore from which aluminium is made – and to a lesser extent tungsten.

Mining commenced in 1960. In 1962, residents accepted Comalco's offer to rebuild the Jessica Point village at a cost of £150,000. By the time building began in 1965, it became clear that funding was inadequate to build houses for the whole community, which contributed towards the Presbyterian Church's decision to hand over responsibility for the mission to the Queensland Government. The community became known as Weipa South after this.

The Weipa Parish of the Roman Catholic Diocese of Cairns was established in 1982.

On 30 March 1985, the Weipa South community elected the Weipa South Aboriginal Council, and the Aboriginal reserve held by the government was transferred to the council on 27 October 1988 under a Deed of Grant in Trust (DOGIT). In 1990, the Weipa South community became known as Napranum, meaning "meeting place of the people". The DOGIT lands became known as the Napranum DOGIT in 1991. In 1992, the Peppan people, originally located to the east of Napranum, were granted freehold title to former Aboriginal reserve land, which had been leased to the Commonwealth for the construction of Scherger Air Force Base. This was the first real compensation to the people of Napranum for use of their land.

In 1995 a major industrial dispute occurred between Comalco and its workforce to maintain union coverage, pay and conditions.

On 1 January 2005, the Napranum Aboriginal Council became the Napranum Aboriginal Shire Council.

Climate
 
Weipa has a tropical savanna climate, with high temperatures above  throughout the year. Three distinct seasons exist. The wet season, which runs from January to April, is characterised by heavy downpours on an almost daily basis. Monsoon lows and tropical cyclones cause even more extreme rainfall, up to 200 mm (8 in) in 24 hours. The dry season, running from May to September, features hot and dry days; however, night-time lows are cooler and rainfall is almost non-existent. Dewpoints in the wet season average ; in the dry season they average . Rainfall during the build-up is infrequent, but when it does occur, it usually falls in brief, heavy downpours associated with severe thunderstorms.

These seasons are not always set, however; sometimes the wet season can start as early as November or the dry season can extend as late as December, and monsoonal downpours have occurred as late as May.

The highest daily rainfall recorded was 327.8 mm (12.9 in) during the passage of Tropical Cyclone Oswald in January 2013.

Economy

The present town was constructed mainly by Comalco (now called Rio Tinto), a large aluminium company, which began making trial shipments of bauxite to Japan in 1962. A railway was constructed to transport the ore from the mine at Andoom to the export facility at Lorim Point. The bauxite mine is among the world's largest. Using figures from 2006, Reuters reported that it ranked third in the world, with capacity and production at 15.5 and 16.1 million tonnes respectively.

Education 

There are two schools in Weipa.

The Western Cape College is a government co-educational school; it provides early childhood (kindergarten), primary and secondary schooling. It is on the corner of Central and Eastern Avenues in Rocky Point. In 2015, the school had an enrolment of 1,073 students with 93 teachers (90 full-time equivalent).

St Joseph's Parish School is a Roman Catholic co-educational primary school at 2 Boundary Road, Rocky Point. Opened in 2016, the school only offered enrolment in years P-3 but expected to be able to offer enrollment across all primary levels (P-6) in 2018.

Amenities

Weipa has a visitor's centre, swimming pool, bowling green, golf club, tennis and squash courts.  There are netball and basketball courts as well as football fields.  Weipa Town Authority operates a public library at Hibberd Drive in Weipa.

At Nanum the shopping precinct has a Woolworths supermarket, bakery, coffee shop, travel agent, clothing shop, post office, newsagency / sports shop and butchers.  There is also a chemist, camping and fishing store and within walking distance is a gift shop, furniture and whitegoods store, credit union and government social security office.  At Evans Landing there are a hardware store and a number of mechanical workshops.

St Joseph's Catholic Church is on Boundary Road at Rocky Point. It is within the Weipa Parish of the Roman Catholic Diocese of Cairns.

Gallery

See also

 Weipa Airport
RAAF Base Scherger, also former site of Weipa Immigrant Detention Centre

References

Further reading
Moon, Ron & Viv. 2003. Cape York: An Adventurer's Guide. 9th edition. Moon Adventure Publications, Pearcedale, Victoria. 
Moore, David R. 1979. Islanders and Aborigines at Cape York: An ethnographic reconstruction based on the 1848–1850 'Rattlesnake' Journals of O. W. Brierly and information he obtained from Barbara Thompson. Australian Institute of Aboriginal Studies. Canberra.  (hbk);  (pbk). USA edition  (hbk);  (pbk).
Roberts, Jan. 1981. Massacres to Mining: The Colonization of Aboriginal Australia. Dove Communications, Blackburn, Victoria. Rev. Australian ed. Previous ed: CIMRA and War on Want, 1978, London. .
Premier's Department (prepared by Connell Wagner). 1989. Cape York Peninsula Resource Analysis. Cairns. 
Roth, W.E. 1897. The Queensland Aborigines. 3 Vols. Reprint: Facsimile Edition, Hesperian Press, Victoria Park, W.A., 1984. 
Ryan, Michelle and Burwell, Colin, eds. 2000. Wildlife of Tropical North Queensland: Cooktown to Mackay. Queensland Museum, Brisbane.  (set of 3 vols).
Scarth-Johnson, Vera. 2000. National Treasures: Flowering plants of Cooktown and Northern Australia. Vera Scarth-Johnson Gallery Association, Cooktown.  (pbk);  Limited Edition – Leather Bound.
Sutton, Peter (ed). Languages of Cape York: Papers presented to a Symposium organised by the Australian Institute of Aboriginal Studies. Australian Institute of Aboriginal Studies, Canberra. (1976). 
Wallace, Lennie. 2003. Cape York Peninsula: A History of Unlauded Heroes 1845–2003. Central Queensland University Press, Rockhampton. 
Wynter, Jo and Hill, John. 1991. Cape York Peninsula: Pathways to Community Economic Development. The Final Report of The Community Economic Development Projects Cook Shire. Cook Shire Council.

External links

"A Cape to Adventure" A description of a 4WD journey to Cape York by Roderick Eime
Cooktown Shire Official web page
Collection of photographs taken by Wolfgang Sievers in 1957 "Presbyterian Mission Station Weipa" held at National Library of Australia, Canberra
University of Queensland: Queensland Places: Weipa
Napranum cha Newspaper, State Library of Queensland- digitised issues of Weipa newspaper produced by Weipa South Community Editorial Committee

Populated places in Far North Queensland
Coastal towns in Queensland
Ports and harbours of Queensland
Mining towns in Queensland
Populated places established in 1898
Gulf of Carpentaria
1898 establishments in Australia
Weipa Town